The alignment level in an audio signal chain or on an audio recording is a defined anchor point that represents a reasonable or typical level.

Analogue 
In analogue systems, alignment level is commonly 0 dBu (0.775 Volts RMS) in broadcast chains and in professional audio is commonly 0 VU, which is +4 dBu or 1.227 Volts RMS. Under normal situations, the 0 VU reference allows for a headroom of 18 dB or more above the reference level without significant distortion. This is largely due to the use of slow-responding VU meters in almost all analogue professional audio equipment which, by their design, and by specification respond to an average level, not peak levels.

Digital 
In digital systems alignment level commonly is at −18 dBFS (18 dB below digital full scale), in accordance with EBU recommendations. Digital equipment must use peak reading metering systems to avoid severe digital distortion caused by the signal going beyond digital full scale. 24-bit original or master recordings commonly have an alignment level at −24 dBFS to allow extra headroom, which can then be reduced to match the available headroom of the final medium by audio level compression. FM broadcasts usually have only 9 dB of headroom as recommended by the EBU, but digital broadcasts, which could operate with 18 dB of headroom, given their low noise floor even in difficult reception areas, currently operate in a state of confusion, with some transmitting at maximum level while others operate at a much lower level even though they carry material that has been compressed for compatibility with the lower dynamic range of FM transmissions.

EBU 
In EBU documents alignment level defines -18 dBFS as the level of the alignment signal, a 1 kHz sine tone for analog applications and 997 Hz in digital applications.

Motivation 
Using alignment level rather than maximum permitted level as the reference point allows more sensible headroom management throughout the audio signal chain compression happens only where intended.

Loudness wars have resulted in increasing playback loudness. Loudness normalisation to a fixed alignment level can improve the experience when listening to mixed material.

Making compression a listening option 
The incorporation of (switchable) level compression in domestic music systems and car in-car systems would allow higher quality on systems capable of wide dynamic range and in situations that allowed realistic reproduction. Such compression systems have been suggested and tried from time to time, but are not in widespread use — a 'chicken and egg' problem since producers feel they must make programmes and recordings that sound good in car with high ambient noise or on cheap low-power music systems. In the UK, some DAB receivers do incorporate a menu setting for automatic loudness compensation which adds extra gain on BBC Radio 3 and BBC Radio 4, to allow for the fact that these programmes adopt lower levels than, for example, the pop station Radio 1. Some television receivers also have a menu setting for loudness normalisation, aimed at helping to reduce excessive loudness on advertisements. However, there is no common agreement to reduce compression and limiting and leave these tasks to the receiver.

See also 
 Audio normalization
 Full scale
 Nominal level
 Programme level
 Transmission-level point

External links 
 EBU Recommendation R128 - Loudness normalisation and permitted maximum level of audio levels (2010)
 EBU Recommendation R68-2000
 EBU Recommendation R117-2006 (against loudness war)
 AES Convention Paper 5538 On Levelling and Loudness Problems at Broadcast Studios
 EBU Tech 3282-E on EBU RDAT Tape Levels 
 EBU R89-1997 on CD-R levels
 Distortion to the People — TC Electronics
 EBU Loudness Group

Audio engineering
Broadcast engineering
Sound production technology
Sound recording
Sound